"One Love" (alternately titled "One Love - Taj Anthem" or "Taj Anthem") is a single by Indian composer A.R. Rahman, which was made to commemorate the beauty of Taj Mahal and celebrate its status as one of the Seven Wonders of the World. The official track list consists of six versions of the track "One Love" rendered in six different languages, Kannada, Tamil, Hindi,  Malayalam, Telugu and Bengali. All the versions were sung by A.R.Rahman, Karthik and Naresh Iyer.

The song was inspired by the beauty of Taj Mahal and celebrates the eternal love and beauty that the Taj represents. The tagline of the album was India Unites for Taj.

Background
One Love was made as a tribute to the magnificent Taj Mahal presented by A. R. Rahman in various languages supporting the campaign for including the Taj Mahal in the New Seven Wonders of the World. The public voting to select the new wonders was launched by the New Seven Wonders Society, a Swiss group, in 2000. Taj was shortlisted in the final 21 contenders. Several campaigns were planned to place Taj in the ultimate list and probably, the most effective one was the song One Love by A. R. Rahman. Also, the song was inspired by the beauty of Taj. The album cover had the following quote inscribed on it: "Let this anthem enthuse you to help the Taj! Go forth and vote! The Taj needs you!!!" The album consisted of a single track featured in six different languages.

Music video
The video of the song was primarily set on the backgrounds of Taj Mahal. The video also incorporated the cultures of various states of India and compiled many regional art forms and martial arts. The video featured A. R. Rahman, a Mumbai-based model Mohsin Akthar and another female model.

Track listing

Personnel
 A.R.Rahman – vocals, lyrics
 Karthik – vocals
 Naresh Iyer – vocals
 Raqeeb Alam – lyrics
Rajeev Alunkal - lyrics (Malayalam)
Rajshri Sudhakar - lyrics (Telugu)
Mashook Rahman - lyrics (Tamil)

References

Songs with music by A. R. Rahman
2007 singles
2007 songs
EMI Records singles